Rodrigo Jhossel Huescas Hurtado (born 18 September 2003) is a Mexican professional footballer who plays as a winger for Liga MX club Cruz Azul.

Career statistics

Club

Honours
Cruz Azul
Supercopa de la Liga MX: 2022

Mexico U20
Revelations Cup: 2022

References

2003 births
Living people
People from Naucalpan
Association football forwards
Liga MX players
Cruz Azul footballers
Footballers from the State of Mexico
Mexican footballers